Yuriy Yuriyovych Kondufor (; 30 January 1922, Zubany, Khorolsky Uyezd – 10 January 1997, Kyiv) was a Soviet and Ukrainian academician, historian, director of the NASU Institute of History of Ukraine in 1978–1993. He was a veteran of World War II (Soviet–Japanese War).

Kondufor was a chief editor of Ukrainian Historical Journal in 1979–1988.

Honored Worker of Science of the Ukrainian SSR (since 1991). Laureate of the State Prize of the Ukrainian SSR in Science and Technology (1980; for his significant personal contribution to the creation of the multi-volume History of the Ukrainian SSR).

References

External links
 Yuriy Kondufor. Encyclopedia of History of Ukraine.

1922 births
1997 deaths
20th-century Ukrainian historians
People from Khorolsky Uyezd
Communist Party of the Soviet Union members
Full Members of the National Academy of Sciences of Ukraine
NANU Institute of History of Ukraine directors
National University of Kharkiv alumni
Academic staff of the Taras Shevchenko National University of Kyiv
Fifth convocation members of the Verkhovna Rada of the Ukrainian Soviet Socialist Republic
Sixth convocation members of the Verkhovna Rada of the Ukrainian Soviet Socialist Republic
Seventh convocation members of the Verkhovna Rada of the Ukrainian Soviet Socialist Republic
Laureates of the State Prize of Ukraine in Science and Technology
Recipients of the Medal "For Courage" (Russia)
Recipients of the Order of the Red Banner of Labour
Soviet historians
Soviet military personnel of World War II from Ukraine
Ukrainian historians
Burials at Baikove Cemetery